Mount Emerson is a mountain  high,  east-southeast of Brewer Peak in the southern part of the DuBridge Range in the Admiralty Mountains of Victoria Land, Antarctica. The topographical feature was first mapped by the United States Geological Survey from surveys and U.S. Navy air photos, 1960–63, and was named by the Advisory Committee on Antarctic Names for George L. Emerson, a U.S. Navy Steelworker at McMurdo Station, Hut Point Peninsula, Ross Island, 1967.

References 

Mountains of Victoria Land
Pennell Coast